Jillian Fiona Banfield  (born Armidale, Australia) is professor at the University of California, Berkeley with appointments in the Earth Science, Ecosystem Science and Materials Science and Engineering departments. She leads the Microbial Research initiative within the Innovative Genomics Institute, is affiliated with Lawrence Berkeley National Laboratory and has a position at the University of Melbourne, Australia. Some of her most noted work includes publications on the structure and functioning of microbial communities and the nature, properties and reactivity (especially crystal growth) of nanomaterials.

Early life and education

Banfield was educated at the Australian National University where she completed her bachelor's and master's degrees (1978–1985) both examining granite weathering. She attributes her initial interest in geomicrobiology to Dr Tony Eggleton who drew her attention to processes at the earth's surface, mineral weathering and the regolith.

Banfield graduated with a PhD in Earth and Planetary Sciences from Johns Hopkins University for high-resolution transmission electron microscopy (HRTEM) studies of metamorphic reactions supervised by David R. Veblen.

Career and research
Banfield is an earth scientist who studies the structure, functioning and diversity of microbial communities in natural environments and the human microbiome. Her laboratory and collaborators pioneered the reconstruction of genomes from natural ecosystems and community metaproteomic analyses. Through genomics, her group has provided insights into previously unknown and little known bacterial and archaeal lineages, leading to a new rendition of the Tree of Life. She has conducted extensive research on natural and synthetic nanomaterials, exploring the impacts of particle size on their structure, properties and reactivity. Her lab described the oriented attachment-based mechanism for growth of nanoparticles and its implications for development of defect microstructures. She has also studied microorganism-mineral interactions, including those that lead to production of nanomaterials.

Banfield was a Fulbright Student in Medicine from the Australian National University to Johns Hopkins University in 1988, and a Mac Arthur Fellow in 1999. She has been a professor at the University of Wisconsin–Madison from 1990 to 2001 and the University of Tokyo (1996–1998). Since 2001, she has been a researcher and professor at the University of California Berkeley where she heads the geomicrobiology program and works as a researcher at the Lawrence Berkeley National Laboratory. Her research as of 2021 spans field sites in Northern California to Australia and covers subjects at the intersection of microbiology and geosciences, including genome-resolved metagenomics, genome editing tool development, astrobiology and microbial carbon capture. In 2023, Banfield became the first woman to win the Leeuwenhoek Medal from the Royal Dutch Society for Microbiology, an award that that has been given roughly every 10 years since 1875 to honor scientists who have made outstanding contributions to science, society and outreach in the field of microbiology.

The Banfield lab studies microbial communities in terrestrial ecosystems, including soils, sediments and groundwater, as well as the human environment (human microbiome and the built environment). Topics of interest include the process of microbial colonization, organism interdependencies, diversity and microbial evolution. This research includes consideration of microbial impacts on mineral dissolution and precipitation and the structure and reactivity of finely particulate nanomaterials and clays that are abundant and important in earth's near-surface environments.

Research exploring microbial diversity and metabolic capacities draws heavily on genome-resolved metagenomic methods coupled to tools that provide insight into function in situ (proteomics, transcriptomics, and metabolomics). In fact, the Banfield lab led the first research that achieved reconstruction of draft genomes from shotgun sequence information (metagenomics, also described as community genomics) as well as the first community (meta)proteomic studies of microbial communities (2004 and 2005, respectively). The combined approaches have been used to investigate many aspects of ecosystem function, including microbial impacts on the carbon, sulfur, nitrogen, iron and hydrogen cycles. Emphasis is placed on analysis of reconstructed genomes because these provide detailed information about genetic potential, with strain resolution, without reliance on laboratory isolation of the organisms or the need for sequences from related (but potentially metabolically distinct) species.

Studies conducted in an underground research facility in Japan are relevant for predicting the implications of microbial activity for the safety of geological disposal of high-level radionuclide wastes. Research conducted at Crystal Geyser (Green River, Utah) probes the potential for subsurface microbial communities to take up CO2 that could leak from CO2 sequestration sites, should such storage be pursued to limit CO2 contamination of the atmosphere from burning of fossil fuels. Research on the sediments and aquifer fluids at a site adjacent to the Colorado River near Rifle, Colorado, targets knowledge gaps related to how subsurface microbial communities are structured, respond to changes in environmental conditions, and influence the chemical form and reactivity of contaminants such as vanadium, selenium, arsenic and uranium. Important outcomes of this work include the first descriptions of hundreds of little known or previously unknown organisms, including those from massive groups of uncultivated bacteria (now referred to as the Candidate Phyla Radiation) and archaea.

Honors and awards
2023 Leeuwenhoek Medal 
2018 Elected a Fellow of the Royal Society (FRS).
2017 V.M. Goldschmidt Award, Geochemical Society
2015 Elected to the Australian Academy of Science (International Member)
2015 Honor doctorate, Ben Gurion University, Israel
2013 Award of Dr. sch. h.c. ETH Zurich, Switzerland
2011 L'Oréal-UNESCO Awards for Women in Science: North American Laureate
2011 Benjamin Franklin Medal in Earth and Environmental Science of the Franklin Institute
2010 Dana Medal of the Mineralogical Society of America
2007 Elected Fellow, The Geochemical Society
2007 ASM Division Q Lecturer (Environmental and General Applied Microbiology)
2006 Elected Fellow, American Academy of Microbiology
2006 Elected to the National Academy of Sciences
2005 Pioneer Lecturer, Clay Minerals Society, June 2005
2005 Rosenqvist Lecturer, Norway, May 2005
2000 Inaugural NSF Earth Science Week Lecturer
2000 Gast Lecturer, Geochemical Society
2000 John Simon Guggenheim Foundation Fellowship
2000 Marion L. and Christie M. Jackson Award of the Clay Minerals Society
1999 Fellow through 2004 MacArthur Foundation
1999 Faculty Achievement Award, UW-Madison
1999 D.A. Brown Medal, Australian National University
1998 H.I. Romnes Faculty Fellowship UW Madison
1997 Mineralogical Society of America Award
1988 Fulbright Scholar in Medicine at Johns Hopkins University

References 

Living people
Australian expatriates in the United States
Australian women geologists
Australian microbiologists
Geomicrobiologists
UC Berkeley College of Engineering faculty
Australian National University alumni
Johns Hopkins University alumni
University of Wisconsin–Madison faculty
MacArthur Fellows
Women microbiologists
Benjamin Franklin Medal (Franklin Institute) laureates
Members of the United States National Academy of Sciences
L'Oréal-UNESCO Awards for Women in Science laureates
21st-century American women scientists
Fellows of the Australian Academy of Science
Evolutionary biologists
Women evolutionary biologists
Fellows of the Royal Society
1959 births
Female Fellows of the Royal Society
Recipients of the V. M. Goldschmidt Award